Jančić's rebellion, also known as the First Mašići rebellion (Прва Машићка буна/Prva Mašićka buna), was a rebellion led by ethnic Serbs in the Gradiška region against the Ottoman government in the Bosnia Eyalet. It broke out in September 1809 following a string of economical, national and religious deprivations of the rights of Serbs. Jančić's rebellion erupted immediately after the failed Yamaks revolt.

Background
With the First Serbian Uprising that broke out in the Sanjak of Smederevo in 1804, hajduk actions also began to the west of the Drina, especially after the decisive Serbian victory at the Battle of Mišar (1806). Hajduks also arrived from Serbia, and they were especially active on the Kozara.  The work of priest Jovo from Svinjar, priest Nikodim from Mačkovac, and the brotherhood of the Moštanica Monastery also led to the uprising. Jovan Jančić, a gunsmith from Sarajevo, smuggled arms for three years from the Military Frontier seeking to arm the Serb-inhabited districts between Una and Bosna rivers.

Rebellion
The revolt broke out in the Bosnian Frontier and Bosnian Posavina. Jovan Jančić–Sarajlija was the organizer of the uprising with help from the bishop Benedikt Kraljević. Jančić negotiated with Serbia, Russia and France regarding the revolt. The Ottomans sensed that something was in planning, so they increased the terror against the population, and Kraljević fled to Austria. While planning the operation, Jančić turned to Austria and France for help, but without any success. In the dilemma of whether to start an uprising without proper planning, he was forestalled by a progress of events.

Peasants took up arms on 23 September 1809, in the region of Gradiška, beginning from Mašići. The fighting began on 25 September, and on the night of 25–26 September, the Ottomans, who had gathered a strong army, captured Jančić in his house. The rest of the rebels, without any commander, were afraid and retreated to their villages. Only the rebels on the mountains of Kozara and Motajica continued, and offered strong resistance, which the Ottomans finally crushed by mid-October, after burning villages and looting. The Roman Catholic population (local Croats, etc.) of the Bosnian frontier intended to join the uprising, but never did. After the crushing of the revolt in mid-October, the Ottoman government in the region captured the rebel leaders and executed them. Some rebel bands became brigands and maintained in the mountains, attacking the Turks. The revolt failed due to lack of coordination between the rebel units.

Aftermath and legacy
In 1826, priest Đorđije Vujičić from Cikota made an unsuccessful attempt at raising a rebellion in Bosnia. Another revolt broke out in the region in 1834, following Priest Jovica's Rebellion, in Mašići, known as the "Second Mašići Rebellion". A memorial plaque stands in Mašići dedicated to the fallen people of both rebellions.

See also
 List of Serbian Revolutionaries

References

Sources

Further reading

External links
Јанчићева буна

Serb rebellions against the Ottoman Empire
Ottoman period in the history of Bosnia and Herzegovina
Gradiška, Bosnia and Herzegovina
History of the Serbs of Bosnia and Herzegovina
Conflicts in 1809
Ottoman–Serbian Wars
1809 in the Ottoman Empire
Rebellions in Bosnia and Herzegovina
19th-century rebellions